Harry Morrison (born 12 November 1998) is a professional Australian rules footballer playing for the Hawthorn Football Club in the Australian Football League (AFL).

Early career 

Playing for the Murray Bushrangers in the TAC Cup, Morrison suffered an anterior cruciate ligament (ACL) injury during the 2014 season as a bottom-aged player. He returned to the Murray Bushrangers for the 2015 season for the second half of the year after starring for the Benalla Saints after his return to football. Morrison then went on to play a crucial role in the Benalla Saints U18 team winning back to back premierships. Morrison then played for the Murray Bushrangers in the 2016 season and was named among the best players in the grand final loss against the Sandringham Dragons.

AFL career
Morrison was drafted by the Hawthorn Football Club with their first selection and seventy-fourth overall in the 2016 national draft. He made his debut  against  in the last round of the 2017 AFL season.

Morrison was named the Round 20 Rising Star nominee for 2018 after an impressive performance against .

Statistics
Updated to the end of the 2022 season.

|-
| 2017 ||  || 35
| 1 || 0 || 1 || 10 || 11 || 21 || 6 || 1 || 0.0 || 1.0 || 10.0 || 11.0 || 21.0 || 6.0 || 1.0 || 0
|-
| 2018 ||  || 35
| 21 || 5 || 8 || 184 || 121 || 305 || 100 || 65 || 0.2 || 0.4 || 8.8 || 5.8 || 14.5 || 4.8 || 3.1 || 0
|-
| 2019 ||  ||  1
| 9 || 0 || 1 || 64 || 52 || 116 || 27 || 29 || 0.0 || 0.1 || 7.1 || 5.8 || 12.9 || 3.0 || 3.2 || 0
|-
| 2020 ||  || 1
| 11 || 0 || 1 || 92 || 64 || 156 || 38 || 19 || 0.0 || 0.1 || 8.4 || 5.8 || 14.2 || 3.5 || 1.7 || 0
|-
| 2021 ||  || 1
| 15 || 7 || 2 || 124 || 107 || 231 || 67 || 34 || 0.5 || 0.1 || 8.3 || 7.1 || 15.4 || 4.5 || 2.3 || 0
|-
| 2022 ||  || 1
| 21 || 9 || 2 || 280 || 123 || 403 || 122 || 58 || 0.4 || 0.1 || 13.3 || 5.9 || 19.2 || 5.8 || 2.8 || 0
|- class="sortbottom"
! colspan=3| Career
! 78 !! 21 !! 15 !! 754 !! 478 !! 1232 !! 360 !! 206 !! 0.3 !! 0.2 !! 9.7 !! 6.1 !! 15.8 !! 4.6 !! 2.6 || 0
|}

Notes

Honours and achievements 
Individual
 AFL Rising Star nominee: 2018

Personal life
Morrison is the cousin of former player Tom Rockliff. He is the godson of late Hawthorn player and coach Ken Judge.

References

External links

1998 births
Living people
Hawthorn Football Club players
Box Hill Football Club players
Murray Bushrangers players
Australian rules footballers from Victoria (Australia)
People from Benalla